Hermann Reinheimer (August 4, 1872 - December 29, 1964) also known as Harry Ryner was a British biologist and early science writer who proposed cooperation in evolution and symbiogenesis.

Biography

Reinheimer was born in Hesse and became a British citizen in 1901. He was a critic of the Darwinian view of struggle for existence. He authored Evolution by Cooperation (1913) and Symbiogenesis (1915) which were influential in developing the concept of symbiosis. He identified symbiosis as a "law of nature". According to science historian Jan Sapp "Reinheimer is virtually unknown among contemporary biologists and historians."

Reinheimer coined the term "bioeconomics" in 1913. In 1915, Reinheimer was one of the first writers to discuss symbiogenesis. However, the term was used without reference to Konstantin Mereschkowski who had previously written on the subject, leading cell biologist Francisco Carrapiço to speculate that Reinheimer was unfamiliar with Mereschkowski's work. In his 1915 book on the topic, Reinheimer defined symbiogenesis as:

Reinheimer was a vegetarian. Little about his life is known, he worked as a stockbroker and was described as living in Surbiton, London in the 1950s. His books were published under his name "Hermann Reinheimer" but his legal name became Harry Ryner.

Reception

Reinheimer's book Nutrition and Evolution described the importance of nutrition as a factor in evolution. A review in the Nature journal suggested that "the conclusion is sound, but we cannot say this of many of the arguments." His book Evolution by Co-Operation received a mixed review in the British Medical Journal which concluded that it is an "interesting and suggestive work".

Reinheimer's views on symbiogenesis were seen as controversial during his time. In 1916, American zoologist William Lawrence Tower described his book Symbiogenesis as the "least logical, worst constructed, most inaccurate and irrational book upon evolution that has happened in a long time." Other reviews were more positive. For example, the Scientific American commented that "even though one may not wholly surrender to Mr. Reinheimer's argument, or accord to his theory that supreme importance with which he invests it, there are in his volume so many important related facts, and so much pause-compelling suggestion, that his work must be reckoned with in any future study of Nature's methods." The book was positively reviewed in The Lancet journal which concluded it would be read with interest by many biologists.

Anthropologist Ashley Montagu wrote that Reinheimer's book Symbiosis "which is all too little known, presents a very stimulating and well-balanced account of the facts". The book was criticized by botanist C. Stuart Gager for containing "numerous statements about plants that are inaccurate or incorrect, and sure to mislead readers not familiar with botany." Botanist Edward James Salisbury described the work as "frankly unorthodox" and noted that its facts are "often only partially apprehended".

Publications

References

1872 births
1964 deaths
20th-century British biologists
Alternative cancer treatment advocates
British science writers
British stockbrokers
German emigrants to England
Non-Darwinian evolution
Symbiogenesis researchers
British vegetarianism activists
Writers from Hesse